The 2006 Prague municipal election was held as part of 2006 Czech municipal elections. It was held on 20 and 21 October 2006. Civic Democratic Party has won a majority in Prague's assembly. Pavel Bém remained Prague's mayor.

Opinion polls

Results

References

2006
Prague municipal election
Prague municipal election
Municipal election, 2006